Andy Wells may refer to:

 Andy Wells (Canadian politician) (1944/5–2021), mayor of St. John's, Newfoundland and Labrador
 Andy Wells (American politician) (born 1954), politician in North Carolina

See also
Andrew Wells,  fictional character in the television series Buffy the Vampire Slayer and Angel